Juan Carlos Del Bello (5 June 1951 – 19 July 2021) was an Argentine academic. He was director of the National Institute of Statistics and Census from 2002 to 2003 and rector of National University of Río Negro since 2008.

References

1951 births
2021 deaths
Argentine politicians
Justicialist Party politicians
National University of Comahue alumni
Universidad Nacional del Sur alumni
Academic staff of the National University of Río Negro
People from Mar del Plata